Green Valley is an unincorporated area and census-designated place (CDP) in southern Frederick County, Maryland, United States. The population was 12,643 at the 2020 census. The area was listed as a census-designated place in 2000 but not listed as part of any CDP at the 2010 census. It was re-designated a census-designated place for the 2020 census.

Geography
The Green Valley area is located in southeastern Frederick County at  (39.341801, −77.240437), bordered to the south and east by Montgomery County. The northern edge of the CDP extends from Mount Airy in the northeast to New Market in the northwest. The unincorporated community of Monrovia is located just to the west.

Demographics

2020 census

Note: the US Census treats Hispanic/Latino as an ethnic category. This table excludes Latinos from the racial categories and assigns them to a separate category. Hispanics/Latinos can be of any race.

2000 Census
As of the census of 2000, there were 12,262 people, 3,882 households, and 3,470 families residing in the CDP. The racial makeup of the CDP was 95.91% White, 1.24% African American, 0.23% Native American, 0.99% Asian, 0.04% Pacific Islander, 0.38% from other races, and 1.22% from two or more races. Hispanic or Latino of any race were 1.69% of the population.

There were 3,882 households, out of which 49.1% had children under the age of 18 living with them, 81.7% were married couples living together, 4.6% had a female householder with no husband present, and 10.6% were non-families. 7.8% of all households were made up of individuals, and 2.8% had someone living alone who was 65 years of age or older. The average household size was 3.16 and the average family size was 3.33.

In the CDP, the population was spread out, with 31.2% under the age of 18, 5.6% from 18 to 24, 30.0% from 25 to 44, 27.5% from 45 to 64, and 5.7% who were 65 years of age or older. The median age was 37 years. For every 100 females, there were 102.6 males. For every 100 females age 18 and over, there were 100.6 males.

The median income for a household in the CDP was $81,732, and the median income for a family was $84,607. Males had a median income of $53,482 versus $37,726 for females. The per capita income for the CDP was $29,408. About 1.9% of families and 2.1% of the population were below the poverty line, including 1.4% of those under age 18 and 0.4% of those age 65 or over.

References

Census-designated places in Maryland
Census-designated places in Frederick County, Maryland